Arieh Lubin (1897–1980) was an Israeli artist.

Biography 
Arieh (Leo) Lubin began to study art in Chicago in 1915, but left to join the Jewish Brigade in World War I.  After the war, he studied in Europe and returned to Israel in 1922.

Artistic style
Lubin's work reflects contemporary trends of the 1920s. His main influences were Paul Cézanne, Pablo Picasso, and Henri Matisse. He absorbed the Cubism of Derain and the Purism of Le Corbusier and Ozenfant by reading "L'Esprit Nouveau", a journal he ordered from Paris.
Lubin was one of the first Israeli artists to settle in the artists quarter of Safed.

Lubin died in Tel Aviv in 1980. He is  buried in Trumpeldor Cemetery.

Awards and recognition
 1922 John Quincy Adams Prize for Study Abroad
 1956 Ramat Gan Panorama Prize
 1957 Olympic Committee Prize for Sports Subjects
 1957 Dizengoff Prize
 1978 Worthy of Tel Aviv

See also
Visual arts in Israel

References

External links 
 
 
Arieh Lubin on Artfact.com

1897 births
1980 deaths
20th-century Israeli painters
Burials at Trumpeldor Cemetery
American emigrants to Israel